Wang Lei (born March 20, 1981 in Shanghai) is a Chinese épée fencer.

Wang won the gold medal at the épée 2006 World Fencing Championships after beating Joaquim Videira 6-5 in the final. He also won the silver medal in the 2004 Summer Olympics.

References

1981 births
Living people
Fencers at the 2004 Summer Olympics
Fencers at the 2008 Summer Olympics
Olympic fencers of China
Olympic silver medalists for China
Fencers from Shanghai
Medalists at the 2004 Summer Olympics
Asian Games medalists in fencing
Fencers at the 2002 Asian Games
Fencers at the 2006 Asian Games
Asian Games gold medalists for China
Asian Games silver medalists for China
Medalists at the 2002 Asian Games
Medalists at the 2006 Asian Games

Chinese male fencers
Olympic medalists in fencing